Vatnik or vatnyk is a political pejorative used in Russia and other post-Soviet states for steadfast jingoistic followers of propaganda from the Russian Government.

The use of the word originates from an Internet meme first spread by Anton Chadskiy on VKontakte in 2011, and later used in Russia, Ukraine, then in other post-Soviet states. Its meaning refers to the original cartoon, which depicts a character made from the material of a padded cotton wool jacket and bearing a black eye, which is used to disparage someone as a blindly patriotic and unintelligent jingoist who pushes the conventional views presented in Russian government media as well as those of Russian web brigades. The name "Vatnik" derives from the cotton wool jacket (Telogreika) that Chadskiy's cartoon character in the meme is made from.

Internet meme 
The meme was created by the Russian artist Anton Chadskiy under the pseudonym Jedem das Seine. His associated picture of an anthropomorphic square-shaped quilted jacket similar to the title character of SpongeBob SquarePants was posted on VK for the first time on September 9, 2011. In 2012, the meme became widely popular on the Internet. Chadskiy created the group for the character on VK called RASHKA - THE SQUARE VATNIK. Rashka is a derogatory nickname for Russia, derived from the English pronunciation of the country's name with the Russian -k diminutive suffix attached.

Chadskiy's original drawing has been reproduced and modified many times. Features that are consistently included are gray color, a red nose from drinking vodka, and a black eye, presumably from a fistfight with another vatnik. The meme became much more widespread in society after the Russian military intervention in Ukraine started in 2014.

In early 2015, Anton Chadskiy reported that he was forced to leave Russia in November 2014 because he feared political persecution by the government. He was living in Kyiv and planning to move to Berlin at the time.

Examples of use
 Orest Liutyi wrote a song about vatniks, as a remake of the famous Russian song "Landyshy". In this song, he named Vladimir Putin as a khuylo.
 We will not let the Russian vata into our homes – the name of the Ukrainian "Boycott Russian Films" campaign;
 Inter is a "vata" channel of Firtash the "kremlyad" (a portmanteau meaning "Kremlin whore") – a critical comment in social networks;
 The proud name "vatnik" – one of the topics at essays and scientific works competition in the Altai State Pedagogical University, that was dedicated to the 70th anniversary of the Soviet Union victory in the German-Soviet War (Second World War).
 During the end of 2014, the comedy television show VATA TV (original: ВАТА TV) was shown in Ukraine. It was devoted to the "vata" phenomenon. It was hosted by the popular 5 Kanal host Viktor Lytovchenko. He had mainly spoken Surzhyk during programs.
 During New Year 2015 celebration, the author of the meme Anton Chadskiy held a humorous action – "Vatnik of the year" award. This action was controversial on the Russian Internet.

See also
 Ruscism
 Mankurt
 Tankie
 Little Pink

References

External links 
 Vatnik on Lurkmore 
 Brief history of "vatnik" term (video)

Anti-Russian sentiment
Internet memes
Russian Internet slang
Russian nationalism
Separatism in Ukraine
War in Donbas
2011 neologisms
Internet memes introduced from Russia